Kevin Bowring is a Welsh former rugby union player and coach. Bowring attended Neath Grammar School for Boys.  A flanker, he played for London Welsh and captained the team. He also represented the Barbarians and Middlesex County .

He progressed into coaching with Wales Under-20, Under-21 and Wales A before being appointed as the first full-time professional coach of the Wales national rugby union team. He was later employed by the Rugby Football Union as an Elite Coach for the England rugby union team.

Bowring is a board member of UK Coaching (former Sports Coach UK) and a member of the Coaching Committee which sets the overall strategy for sports coaching in the UK.

References

External links
Wales profile

Living people
Barbarian F.C. players
London Welsh RFC players
Middlesex County RFU players
People educated at Neath Grammar School for Boys
Rugby union players from Neath
Wales national rugby union team coaches
Welsh rugby union coaches
Welsh rugby union players
Year of birth missing (living people)